Chewdara or Chivdora,() is a village in the Rathsun block of the Beerwah tehsil in Budgam district of Jammu and Kashmir, India. Chewdara has two panchayats, Chewdara-A and Chewdara-B.

Demographics

Population 
As of the 2011 census, the population of Chewdara is 4161, of which 2264 are males and 1897 are females. The total number of children below 6 years is 824 as per the report. There are about 626 houses in Chewdara.

Religion

Geography 
The total geographical area of Chewdara village is 249.7 Hectares (2.497 km2). It is located at an elevation of 1,580 m (5,180 ft.) above the sea level.

Educational institutions

Schools
The major institutions in Chewdara are the Government Higher Secondary School and the Al-Huda International School.

Orphanages
Apna Ghar, an orphanage located in Chewdara Beerwah.

Transport 

The nearest railway station to Chewdara is the Mazhom railway station, and the nearest airport is the Sheikh ul-Alam International Airport. And nearest town chewdara is Magam.

Mosques 
There are two mosques in the village that hold congregational Friday prayers.

Shrines 

Shrines/Aastan of Sufis/Auliya'as in Chewdara. Their names are as follows:

 Hazrat Baba Naseeb-Ud-Din Ghazi  (Chewdara-A).
 Syed Ali Allauddin Khansahib Razvi-Al Bukhari, including Syed Ali's father "Syed Saif Ud Din (khansahib) Bukhari (R.A)" (Chewdara-B).

Notable Persons 

 Pir Ali Shah Kashmiri (poet): He is the author of one of the most popular book/Mathnawi in kashmiri language "Khadeej/Khatij/Khadijah Namah". Which is all about the first wife of Prophet Mohammed namely Khadija bint Khuwaylid.

 His Other Works :
 Jang-i-Deenur (history) 
 Wafat Namah (mathnavi)
 Jang-i-Zytoon (history)
 Qissah Tameem Ansari (literature)
 Umm-ul-Moumineen (bio.)
• Pir Ali Shah was the grandson of admired saint "Hazrat Syed Mir Muhammad Simnani " and the disciple of Baba Naseeb Ud Din Ghazi. He died soon after his return from pilgrimage (Makkah) in 1858. He was buried in the cemetery of Chewdara village near the shrine of Syed Ali Allauddin Khansahib Razvi Al-Bukhari .

 Basher Basheer (writer), he wrote a book in kashmiri language "Yeman Padan Mai Wetchaar Gutchui" in 2008 and he also wrote a book "Tsey Shoubi Alamdari" about Shiekh Noor Ud Din Noorani

See also 
 Rathsoon.
 Aripanthan.
 Pethmakhama.
 Beerwah.
 Ohangam.
 Sonapah. 
 Wanihama. 
 Meerpora. 
 Kandour. 
 Arizal .

References

External links 
 
 Official Website of Budgam District.
 .

Villages in Budgam district
Villages in Beerwah tehsil